The 1969 season was the Minnesota Vikings' ninth season in the National Football League (NFL) and their third under head coach Bud Grant. With a 12–2 record, the best in the league, the Vikings won the NFL Central division title, to qualify for the playoffs for the second year in a row. This was the first of three consecutive seasons as the best team in the NFL for the Vikings. They beat the Los Angeles Rams in the Western Conference Championship Game, and the Cleveland Browns in the final NFL Championship Game before the merger with the American Football League. With these wins, the Vikings became the last team to possess the Ed Thorp Memorial Trophy, introduced 35 years earlier in 1934.

However, Minnesota lost Super Bowl IV in New Orleans to the AFL champion Kansas City Chiefs in the final professional football game between the two leagues. It was the second consecutive Super Bowl win for the younger league.

The season was chronicled for America's Game: The Missing Rings, as one of the five greatest NFL teams to never win the Super Bowl.

Offseason

1969 Draft

 The Vikings traded their first-round selection (17th overall) and 1968 first-round selection (7th overall) to New Orleans in exchange for QB Gary Cuozzo.
 The Vikings traded QB Fran Tarkenton to the New York Giants in exchange for the Giants' second-round selection (39th overall), 1967 first- and second-round selections (2nd and 28th overall), and 1968 first-round selection (1st overall).
 The Vikings traded their third-round selection (69th overall) to the Philadelphia Eagles in exchange for QB King Hill.
 The Vikings traded QB Ron Vander Kelen to the Atlanta Falcons in exchange for Atlanta's fifth-round selection (106th overall) and 1968 seventh-round selection (167th overall).
 The Vikings traded RB Bobby Walden to the Pittsburgh Steelers in exchange for the fifth-round selection the Steelers acquired from the Detroit Lions (112th overall).
 The Vikings originally had the 147th overall selection but passed, allowing San Diego to move up, giving Minnesota the 148th overall selection.
 The Vikings traded their seventh-round selection (173rd overall) to the Washington Redskins in exchange for S Paul Krause.
 The Vikings originally had the 251st overall selection but passed, allowing San Diego and St. Louis to move up, giving Minnesota the 253rd overall selection.
 The Vikings traded their 16th-round selection (407th overall) to the Detroit Lions in exchange for Detroit's 1968 17th-round selection (445th overall).

Preseason

Regular season
The Vikings, led by head coach Bud Grant, ended the season with an NFL-best 12–2 regular season record, leading the league in total points scored (379) and fewest points allowed (133), scoring 50 or more points in three of their games. They had 12 straight victories, the longest single-season winning streak in 35 years, and became the first modern NFL expansion team to win an NFL championship. Their defense, considered the most intimidating in the NFL, was anchored by a defensive line nicknamed the "Purple People Eaters", consisting of defensive tackles Gary Larsen and Alan Page, and defensive ends Carl Eller and Jim Marshall. The secondary was led by defensive backs Bobby Bryant (8 interceptions, 97 return yards), Earsell Mackbee (6 interceptions, 100 return yards) and future Pro Football Hall of Famer Paul Krause (5 interceptions, 82 return yards, 1 touchdown).

On offense, quarterback Joe Kapp was known for his superb leadership and his running ability, both throwing on the run and running for extra yards. And when Kapp did take off and run, instead of sliding when he was about to be tackled like most quarterbacks, he lowered his shoulder and went right at the tackler. This style of play earned him the nickname "Indestructible". In the NFL championship game against the Cleveland Browns, he collided with linebacker Jim Houston while running for a first down, and Houston had to be helped off the field after the play ended. Kapp was also known for being an extremely unselfish leader: when he was voted the Vikings' Most Valuable Player, he turned the award down and said that every player on the team was equally valuable.

Running back Dave Osborn was the team's top rusher with 643 yards and 7 touchdowns. He also caught 22 passes for 236 yards and another touchdown. In the passing game, Pro Bowl wide receiver Gene Washington averaged 21.1 yards per catch, recording 821 yards and 9 touchdowns off just 39 receptions. Wide receiver John Henderson caught 34 passes for 553 yards and 5 touchdowns. The Vikings offensive line was anchored by Pro Bowlers Grady Alderman and Mick Tingelhoff.

The Vikings clinched the division title in week 11, after their second defeat of the Detroit Lions on November 27, which also secured home-field advantage for the NFL playoffs. The playoff sites were rotated until 1975; the Central division hosted the Coastal (as in 1967), and the Western Conference hosted the NFL championship game in odd-numbered years.

Schedule

^ The October 5 game was played in Minneapolis at Memorial Stadium at the University of Minnesota, due to a clash with the Minnesota Twins hosting game three of the 1969 ALCS at Metropolitan Stadium on Monday, October 6.

Game summaries

Week 1: at New York Giants

Week 2: vs. Baltimore Colts

Week 3: vs. Green Bay Packers

Week 4: at Chicago Bears

Week 5: at St. Louis Cardinals

Week 6: vs. Detroit Lions

Week 7: vs. Chicago Bears

Week 8: vs. Cleveland Browns

Week 9: at Green Bay Packers

Week 10: vs. Pittsburgh Steelers

Week 11: at Detroit Lions

Week 12: at Los Angeles Rams

Week 13: vs. San Francisco 49ers

Week 14: at Atlanta Falcons

Standings

Postseason

Playoffs

Western Conference Championship Game

Three weeks prior to this game, the teams met in Los Angeles in a battle between the undefeated (11–0) Rams and the 10–1 Vikings. The Vikings won that game 20–13. The rematch was played in the cold and snow of Minnesota. Despite committing more turnovers (3 to 1) and only gaining 20 more total yards (275–255), the Vikings managed to edge out the Rams for their first postseason win in franchise history.

In the game in L.A., the Viking defense shut down the Rams' wide receivers and outside running game, so in this game, the Rams attacked the middle of the Viking defense and neutralized the Viking pass rush with short quick passes to the tight ends. The Rams defense held Minnesota's high powered offense in check, with the "Fearsome Foursome" defensive line harassing Viking QB Joe Kapp. Early on, the momentum seemed to be in LA's favor. Rams safety Richie Petitbon recovered a fumble from fullback Bill Brown that gave his team a first down on the Minnesota 45-yard line. On the next play, it appeared that the Vikings took a quick lead as Carl Eller intercepted a Roman Gabriel pass and returned for a touchdown but the score was nullified on an offside penalty on Alan Page. Taking advantage of their second chance, running back Larry Smith gained 19 yards on three carries, and Gabriel eventually finished the drive with a 3-yard touchdown pass to tight end Bob Klein. The Vikings quickly stormed back, with Kapp completing four consecutive passes on a 10-play, 75-yard drive. Three of the completions were to receiver Gene Washington for 49 total yards, including a 27-yard reception that gave the Vikings the ball on the Rams' 4-yard line. Dave Osborn ran for a touchdown on the next play, tying the score at 7 with a little over 3 minutes left in the first quarter.

LA moved the ball effectively on their next drive, but it ended on a missed 38-yard field goal attempt by Bruce Gossett. The next time they got the ball, they did much better, taking up the majority of the second quarter, including a 13-yard run by Gabriel to convert a third down. Gossett finished the drive with a 20-yard field goal to put the Rams up 10–7 with 4:30 left before halftime. Following a punt, Gabriel led his team back for more points. This time he completed passes to tight end Billy Truax for gains of 18 and 16 yards before finishing the 13-play, 65-yard drive with a 2-yard touchdown pass to Truax. The Rams went into halftime leading 17–7, having scored on three of their four first half possessions.

In the second half, Viking coach Bud Grant adjusted his defense to stop the Ram tight ends, and his "Purple People Eaters" continued to punish the Ram running game. They also got increasing pressure on Gabriel. On offense, Grant neutralized the Ram pass rush by having QB Kapp run the ball, either on designed plays like quarterback draws or roll outs, or by instructing him to take off and run at the first sign of pressure. Kapp began frustrating the Rams with runs; this threat caused their pass rush to be less aggressive.

After forcing the Rams to punt for the first time in the game on the opening possession of the second half, Kapp completed a 41-yard pass to Washington on the LA 12-yard line. After a Rams penalty and a 5-yard run by Kapp, Osborn finished the drive with a 1-yard touchdown run that cut Minnesota's deficit to 17–14. However, Minnesota's comeback attempt suffered major setbacks over the next few drives against a punishing effort from the Rams defense. The next time the Vikings got the ball, they drove deep into Rams territory, only to have Kapp throw an interception to safety Ed Meador on the LA 4-yard line. Meador fumbled the ball during the return, but linebacker Jim Purnell recovered it. After an LA punt, Kapp was intercepted again, this time by Petitbon, who returned the ball 4 yards to the Vikings' 36. Once again, the Viking defense bent but didn't break, stopping the Rams inside the 10 yard line and making them settle for a 27-yard Gossett field goal. So instead of being down 24–14, it was only 20–14 going into the fourth quarter.

Kapp subsequently marched the Vikings 65 yards downfield, completing three passes for 40 yards and going the final 2 yards himself as Minnesota took its first lead of the game, 21–20, with 8:24 on the clock. Then the Viking defense took over. After their special teams unit tackled returner Ron Smith on the 12-yard line during the ensuing kickoff, Carl Eller sacked Gabriel in the end zone for a safety, giving the Vikings a 23–20 lead and the ball. But the Rams defense held, and 1969 NFL MVP Gabriel began to march the Rams down field in the last two minutes. As they crossed midfield, it appeared the Rams might get the tying field goal or winning touchdown, but a Gabriel pass was tipped and intercepted at the Viking 40-yard line by Alan Page with 30 seconds left, allowing his team to run out the clock and win.

Gabriel completed 22/30 passes for 150 yards and two touchdowns, with 1 interception, while also rushing for 26 yards. Larry Smith was the top rusher of the game with 11 carries for 60 yards, and he caught 6 passes for 36. Kapp completed 12/19 passes for 196 yards with 2 interceptions, while also rushing for 41 yards and a touchdown. Washington caught 4 passes for 90 yards.

NFL Championship Game

Cleveland had lost the previous season's NFL title game 34–0, and this time fared little better. The Vikings dominated the game, racking up 381 yards without losing a single turnover, while Cleveland gained just 268 yards and turned the ball over three times.

The Vikings took a lead just four minutes into the first quarter, driving 70 yards for a touchdown in 8 plays. The key play of the drive was a pass from Joe Kapp to receiver Gene Washington that was nearly 5 yards short of the mark. Despite the short throw, Washington was able to come back and haul it in for a 33-yard gain to the Browns' 24-yard line. Two plays later, Dave Osborn's 12-yard run moved the ball to the 7. Then two plays after that, Bill Brown accidentally slipped and bumped into Kapp while moving up to take a handoff, but Kapp simply kept the ball himself and ran it 7 yards for a touchdown.

The situation never got any better for Cleveland. The next time Minnesota got the ball, defensive back Erich Barnes slipped while in one-on-one coverage with Washington, enabling him to catch a pass from Kapp and take off for a 75-yard touchdown completion. Near the end of the first quarter, Browns running back Leroy Kelly lost a fumble that was recovered by linebacker Wally Hilgenberg on the Cleveland 43. Kapp then completed a 12-yard pass to Washington before Fred Cox finished the drive with a 30-yard field goal, putting the Vikings up 17–0. Later in the second period, Hilgenberg snuffed out a Cleveland scoring threat by intercepting a pass from Bill Nelsen on the Vikings' 33-yard line. Minnesota subsequently drove 67 yards in 8 plays. Kapp started the drive with a pair of completions to John Henderson for 17 total yards, while Osborn broke off a 16-yard run and ended up finishing the drive with a 20-yard touchdown burst, giving the Vikings a 24–0 lead with 4:46 left in the first half. Cleveland responded with a drive to the Vikings' 17, but turned the ball over on downs when Nelsen overthrew receiver Gary Collins in the end zone on 4th-and-3.

The third quarter was mostly uneventful, other than Cox's 32-yard field goal that gave Minnesota a 27–0 lead after an 11-play, 80-yard drive. The most noteworthy play was a 13-yard scramble by Kapp in which he plowed into 240-pound Browns linebacker Jim Houston so hard that Houston was knocked out of the game. In the fourth quarter, Cleveland finally got on the board when a diving 18-yard reception by Paul Warfield set up Nelsen's 3-yard touchdown pass to Collins. There were still 13 minutes on the clock at this point, but there would be no more scoring. The Vikings had a drive to the Cleveland 2-yard line, but decided to let the clock run out instead of going for another score.

Kapp completed just seven of 13 pass attempts, but threw for 169 yards and a touchdown, while also rushing for 57 yards and another score. Osborn rushed 18 times for 108 yards and a touchdown. Washington had 120 yards and a touchdown on just three receptions. Kelly was the Browns' top rusher with 80 yards, while also catching two passes for 17. Nelsen completed just 17 of 33 passes for 181 yards, with one touchdown and two interceptions.

Super Bowl IV

Awards and records
Led NFL, points scored (379)
Led NFL, fewest points allowed (133)
Joe Kapp – 7 passing touchdowns in a single game (NFL record) – Week 2

Roster

Statistics

Team leaders

League rankings

References

External links
Vikings on Pro-Football-Reference

Minnesota Vikings seasons
Minnesota
National Football League championship seasons
Minnesota Vikings